Channapur is a village in Belgaum district in the southern state of Karnataka, India. It comes under Channapura Panchayath and it belongs to Bangalore Division.

References

Villages in Belagavi district